In machine learning, backpropagation (backprop, BP) is a widely used algorithm for training feedforward artificial neural networks. Generalizations of backpropagation exist for other artificial neural networks (ANNs), and for functions generally. These classes of algorithms are all referred to generically as "backpropagation". In fitting a neural network, backpropagation computes the gradient of the loss function with respect to the weights of the network for a single input–output example, and does so efficiently, unlike a naive direct computation of the gradient with respect to each weight individually. This efficiency makes it feasible to use gradient methods for training multilayer networks, updating weights to minimize loss; gradient descent, or variants such as stochastic gradient descent, are commonly used. The backpropagation algorithm works by computing the gradient of the loss function with respect to each weight by the chain rule, computing the gradient one layer at a time, iterating backward from the last layer to avoid redundant calculations of intermediate terms in the chain rule; this is an example of dynamic programming.

The term backpropagation strictly refers only to the algorithm for computing the gradient, not how the gradient is used; however, the term is often used loosely to refer to the entire learning algorithm, including how the gradient is used, such as by stochastic gradient descent. Backpropagation generalizes the gradient computation in the delta rule, which is the single-layer version of backpropagation, and is in turn generalized by automatic differentiation, where backpropagation is a special case of reverse accumulation (or "reverse mode").

Overview
Backpropagation computes the gradient in weight space of a feedforward neural network, with respect to a loss function. Denote:
 : input (vector of features)
 : target output
For classification, output will be a vector of class probabilities (e.g., and target output is a specific class, encoded by the one-hot/dummy variable (e.g.).
 : loss function or "cost function"
For classification, this is usually cross entropy (XC, log loss), while for regression it is usually squared error loss (SEL).
 : the number of layers
 : activation functions at layer 
For classification the last layer is usually the logistic function for binary classification, and softmax (softargmax) for multi-class classification, while for the hidden layers this was traditionally a sigmoid function (logistic function or others) on each node (coordinate), but today is more varied, with rectifier (ramp, ReLU) being common.

In the derivation of backpropagation, other intermediate quantities are used; they are introduced as needed below. Bias terms are not treated specially, as they correspond to a weight with a fixed input of 1. For the purpose of backpropagation, the specific loss function and activation functions do not matter, as long as they and their derivatives can be evaluated efficiently. Traditional activation functions include but are not limited to sigmoid, tanh, and ReLU. Since, swish, mish, and other activation functions were proposed as well.

The overall network is a combination of function composition and matrix multiplication:

For a training set there will be a set of input–output pairs, . For each input–output pair  in the training set, the loss of the model on that pair is the cost of the difference between the predicted output  and the target output :

Note the distinction: during model evaluation, the weights are fixed, while the inputs vary (and the target output may be unknown), and the network ends with the output layer (it does not include the loss function). During model training, the input–output pair is fixed, while the weights vary, and the network ends with the loss function.

Backpropagation computes the gradient for a fixed input–output pair , where the weights  can vary. Each individual component of the gradient,  can be computed by the chain rule; however, doing this separately for each weight is inefficient. Backpropagation efficiently computes the gradient by avoiding duplicate calculations and not computing unnecessary intermediate values, by computing the gradient of each layer – specifically, the gradient of the weighted input of each layer, denoted by  – from back to front.

Informally, the key point is that since the only way a weight in  affects the loss is through its effect on the next layer, and it does so linearly,  are the only data you need to compute the gradients of the weights at layer , and then you can compute the previous layer  and repeat recursively. This avoids inefficiency in two ways. Firstly, it avoids duplication because when computing the gradient at layer , you do not need to recompute all the derivatives on later layers  each time. Secondly, it avoids unnecessary intermediate calculations because at each stage it directly computes the gradient of the weights with respect to the ultimate output (the loss), rather than unnecessarily computing the derivatives of the values of hidden layers with respect to changes in weights .

Backpropagation can be expressed for simple feedforward networks in terms of matrix multiplication, or more generally in terms of the adjoint graph.

Matrix multiplication
For the basic case of a feedforward network, where nodes in each layer are connected only to nodes in the immediate next layer (without skipping any layers), and there is a loss function that computes a scalar loss for the final output, backpropagation can be understood simply by matrix multiplication. Essentially, backpropagation evaluates the expression for the derivative of the cost function as a product of derivatives between each layer from right to left – "backwards" – with the gradient of the weights between each layer being a simple modification of the partial products (the "backwards propagated error").

Given an input–output pair , the loss is:

For backpropagation, the activation  as well as the derivatives  (evaluated at ) must be cached for use during the backwards pass.

The derivative of the loss in terms of the inputs is given by the chain rule; note that each term is a total derivative, evaluated at the value of the network (at each node) on the input :

where  is a Hadamard product, that is an element-wise product.

These terms are: the derivative of the loss function; the derivatives of the activation functions; and the matrices of weights:

The gradient  is the transpose of the derivative of the output in terms of the input, so the matrices are transposed and the order of multiplication is reversed, but the entries are the same:

Backpropagation then consists essentially of evaluating this expression from right to left (equivalently, multiplying the previous expression for the derivative from left to right), computing the gradient at each layer on the way; there is an added step, because the gradient of the weights isn't just a subexpression: there's an extra multiplication.

Introducing the auxiliary quantity  for the partial products (multiplying from right to left), interpreted as the "error at level " and defined as the gradient of the input values at level :

Note that  is a vector, of length equal to the number of nodes in level ; each component is interpreted as the "cost attributable to (the value of) that node".

The gradient of the weights in layer  is then:

The  can easily be computed recursively, going from right to left, as:

The gradients of the weights can thus be computed using a few matrix multiplications for each level; this is backpropagation.

there are two key differences with backpropagation:

 Computing  in terms of  avoids the obvious duplicate multiplication of layers  and beyond. 
 Multiplying starting from  – propagating the error backwards – means that each step simply multiplies a vector by the matrices of weights  and derivatives of activations . By contrast, multiplying forwards, starting from the changes at an earlier layer, means that each multiplication multiplies a matrix by a matrix.

Adjoint graph

For more general graphs, and other advanced variations, backpropagation can be understood in terms of automatic differentiation, where backpropagation is a special case of reverse accumulation (or "reverse mode").

Intuition

Motivation
The goal of any supervised learning algorithm is to find a function that best maps a set of inputs to their correct output. The motivation for backpropagation is to train a multi-layered neural network such that it can learn the appropriate internal representations to allow it to learn any arbitrary mapping of input to output.

Learning as an optimization problem
To understand the mathematical derivation of the backpropagation algorithm, it helps to first develop some intuition about the relationship between the actual output of a neuron and the correct output for a particular training example. Consider a simple neural network with two input units, one output unit and no hidden units, and in which each neuron uses a linear output (unlike most work on neural networks, in which mapping from inputs to outputs is non-linear) that is the weighted sum of its input. 

Initially, before training, the weights will be set randomly. A loss function  is used for measuring the discrepancy between the target output  and the computed output . For regression analysis problems the squared error can be used as a loss function, for classification the categorical crossentropy can be used.

As an example consider a regression problem using the square error as a loss:

where  is the discrepancy or error.
Consider the network on a single training case: . Now if the relation is plotted between the network's output  on the horizontal axis and the error  on the vertical axis, the result is a parabola. The minimum of the parabola corresponds to the output  which minimizes the error . For a single training case, the minimum also touches the horizontal axis, which means the error will be zero and the network can produce an output  that exactly matches the target output . Therefore, the problem of mapping inputs to outputs can be reduced to an optimization problem of finding a function that will produce the minimal error. 

However, the output of a neuron depends on the weighted sum of all its inputs:

Therefore, the error also depends on the incoming weights to the neuron, which is ultimately what needs to be changed in the network to enable learning.

In this example, upon injecting the training data , the loss function becomes

Then, the loss function  takes the form of a parabolic cylinder with its base directed along . Since all sets of weights that satisfy  minimize the loss function, in this case additional constraints are required to converge to a unique solution. Additional constraints could either be generated by setting specific conditions to the weights, or by injecting additional training data.

One commonly used algorithm to find the set of weights that minimizes the error is gradient descent. By backpropagation, the steepest descent direction is calculated of the loss function versus the present synaptic weights. Then, the weights can be modified along the steepest descent direction, and the error is minimized in an efficient way.

Derivation
The gradient descent method involves calculating the derivative of the loss function with respect to the weights of the network. This is normally done using backpropagation. Assuming one output neuron, the squared error function is

where
 is the loss for the output  and target value ,
 is the target output for a training sample, and
 is the actual output of the output neuron.

For each neuron , its output  is defined as

where the activation function  is non-linear and differentiable over the activation region (the ReLU is not differentiable at one point). A historically used activation function is the logistic function:

which has a convenient derivative of:

The input  to a neuron is the weighted sum of outputs  of previous neurons. The variable  denotes the weight between neuron  of the previous layer and neuron  of the current layer.

Finding the derivative of the error

Calculating the partial derivative of the error with respect to a weight  is done using the chain rule twice:

 

If the neuron is in the first layer after the input layer,  is just .

The derivative of the output of neuron  with respect to its input is simply the partial derivative of the activation function:

which for the logistic activation function 

This is the reason why backpropagation requires the activation function to be differentiable. (Nevertheless, the ReLU activation function, which is non-differentiable at 0, has become quite popular, e.g. in AlexNet)

The first factor is straightforward to evaluate if the neuron is in the output layer, because then  and

If half of the square error is used as loss function we can rewrite it as

 

Considering  as a function with the inputs being all neurons  receiving input from neuron ,

 

 
 

with

if  is the logistic function, and the error is the square error:

 

To update the weight  using gradient descent, one must choose a learning rate, . If , an increase in  increases ; conversely, if , an increase in  decreases . The new  is added to the old weight, and the product of the learning rate and the gradient, multiplied by  guarantees that  changes in a way that always decreases . In other words, in the equation immediately below,  always changes  in such a way that  is decreased:

Second-order gradient descent
Using a Hessian matrix of second-order derivatives of the error function, the Levenberg-Marquardt algorithm often converges faster than first-order gradient descent, especially when the topology of the error function is complicated. It may also find solutions in smaller node counts for which other methods might not converge. The Hessian can be approximated by the Fisher information matrix.

Loss function

The loss function is a function that maps values of one or more variables onto a real number intuitively representing some "cost" associated with those values. For backpropagation, the loss function calculates the difference between the network output and its expected output, after a training example has propagated through the network.

Assumptions
The mathematical expression of the loss function must fulfill two conditions in order for it to be possibly used in backpropagation. The first is that it can be written as an average  over error functions , for  individual training examples, . The reason for this assumption is that the backpropagation algorithm calculates the gradient of the error function for a single training example, which needs to be generalized to the overall error function.  The second assumption is that it can be written as a function of the outputs from the neural network.

Example loss function

Select an error function  measuring the difference between two outputs. The standard choice is the square of the Euclidean distance between the vectors  and :The error function over  training examples can then be written as an average of losses over individual examples:

Limitations

 Gradient descent with backpropagation is not guaranteed to find the global minimum of the error function, but only a local minimum; also, it has trouble crossing plateaus in the error function landscape. This issue, caused by the non-convexity of error functions in neural networks, was long thought to be a major drawback, but Yann LeCun et al. argue that in many practical problems, it is not.
 Backpropagation learning does not require normalization of input vectors; however, normalization could improve performance.
 Backpropagation requires the derivatives of activation functions to be known at network design time.

History

The basics of continuous backpropagation were derived in the context of control theory by Henry J. Kelley in 1960, and by Arthur E. Bryson in 1961. They used principles of dynamic programming. In 1962, Stuart Dreyfus published a simpler derivation based only on the chain rule. Bryson and Ho described it as a multi-stage dynamic system optimization method in 1969. Backpropagation was derived by multiple researchers in the early 60's and implemented to run on computers as early as 1970 by Seppo Linnainmaa. Paul Werbos was first in the US to propose that it could be used for neural nets after analyzing it in depth in his 1974 dissertation. While not applied to neural networks, in 1970 Linnainmaa published the general method for automatic differentiation (AD). Although very controversial, some scientists believe this was actually the first step toward developing a back-propagation algorithm. In 1973 Dreyfus adapts parameters of controllers in proportion to error gradients. In 1974 Werbos mentioned the possibility of applying this principle to artificial neural networks, and in 1982 he applied Linnainmaa's AD method to non-linear functions.

Later the Werbos method was rediscovered and described in 1985 by Parker, and in 1986 by Rumelhart, Hinton and Williams. Rumelhart, Hinton and Williams showed experimentally that this method can generate useful internal representations of incoming data in hidden layers of neural networks. Yann LeCun proposed the modern form of the back-propagation learning algorithm for neural networks in his PhD thesis in 1987. In 1993, Eric Wan won an international pattern recognition contest through backpropagation.

During the 2000s it fell out of favour, but returned in the 2010s, benefitting from cheap, powerful GPU-based computing systems. This has been especially so in speech recognition, machine vision, natural language processing, and language structure learning research (in which it has been used to explain a variety of phenomena related to first and second language learning.).

Error backpropagation has been suggested to explain human brain ERP components like the N400 and P600.

See also

 Artificial neural network
 Neural circuit
 Catastrophic interference
 Ensemble learning
 AdaBoost
 Overfitting
 Neural backpropagation
 Backpropagation through time

Notes

References

Further reading

External links
 Backpropagation neural network tutorial at the Wikiversity
 
 
 
 

Machine learning algorithms
Artificial neural networks